Bries may refer to:

 German name of Brezno, Slovakia
 German name of Březí (Prague-East District), Czech Republic

See also
 Brie (disambiguation)
 Březno (disambiguation)
 Březí (disambiguation)